Crioestaminal - Saúde e Tecnologia, SA, was founded in 2003, becoming the first umbilical cord blood bank in the Iberian Peninsula. Since then, it has developed into the largest Portuguese and one of the five largest cryo-preservation banks in Europe with over 60,000 stored samples. Crioestaminal was the first company to be authorized by the Portuguese Ministry of Health and is the only family bank with an AABB (American Association of Blood Banks) accreditation in Portugal. In Europe, there are only five banks with an AABB accreditation.

History
Crioestaminal was founded by a group of scientists and health care professionals in 2003.

In 2006, Crioestaminal opened its state-of-the-art laboratory in the Biocant Park, Portugal's first biotechnology science park.

During the same year, Crioestaminal founded a company focused molecular biology diagnostics: Genelab – Diagnóstico Molecular.

In 2007, Crioestaminal released a first sample to be used in a transplant. The cord blood stem cells were used to treat a child with Severe combined immunodeficiency (SCID). The sample belonged to the child’s sibling and had been stored since 2003.

In 2009, The Riverside Group became the company’s main shareholder. During the last years, the US investment company has contributed to Crioestaminal’s growth in Portugal and abroad.

Crioestaminal acquired Celvitae, a Spanish company, in 2010 to strengthen its presence in the neighboring country.

In 2013, Crioestaminal announced a new investment project that will transform the company into the second-largest cord blood and tissue cryopreservation bank in Europe by storage capacity. During the same year, the company won the customer choice award Escolha do Consumidor.

Research and development 
Crioestaminal invests a significant share of its revenues in R&D projects. The projects aim to develop stem cell-based therapies to further expand the number the clinical applications of cord blood and tissue. It has built a network of partnerships with local institutions such as [Instituto Superior Técnico|Instituto Superior Técnico de Lisboa], and the Centro de Histocompatibilidade do Centro.

In 2012, Crioestaminal received its first patent for a technology based on cord blood stem cells. The invention is a formulation containing a gel and cord blood stem cells that can be used to treat chronic wounds in diabetic patients. The investigation was led by Lino Ferreira, a scientist from the Centro de Neurociências e Biologia Celular da Universidade de Coimbra.

References

Biotechnology companies established in 2003
Biotechnology companies of Portugal
Portuguese brands
2003 establishments in Portugal